Sheetla Sahai (1932–2011) was a leader of Bharatiya Janata Party. He was a cabinet minister in Government of Madhya Pradesh. He represented Gwalior in the Madhya Pradesh Legislative Assembly. He died in 2011. He was elected MLA for the first time in 1967. He served as Opposition Leader and also as Cabinet Minister and held portfolios of health, housing, public contact, home, transport, jail, irrigation, Narmada Valley Development.

Sahai is survived by his daughters, Archana Shrivastava (nee Sahai), Alka Pradhan (nee Sahai) and Achala Sahai. Alka is married to Vinod Pradhan, son of Late K.N. Pradhan, a prominent Congress Leader from Madhya Pradesh, erstwhile member of Eighth Lok Sabha representing Bhopal parliamentary constituency of Madhya Pradesh and served as Cabinet Minister in the Government of Madhya Pradesh from 1969 to 1972.

References

For more information about shri Sahai follow link https://web.archive.org/web/20140714133334/http://shitlasahai.org/

2011 deaths
1932 births
State cabinet ministers of Madhya Pradesh
Bharatiya Jana Sangh politicians
Madhya Pradesh MLAs 1967–1972
People from Gwalior
Bharatiya Janata Party politicians from Madhya Pradesh